Team SmartStop was an American UCI Continental cycling team that was formed in 2008 when the team Time was disbanded. SmartStop was originally named Mountain Khakis. Team SmartStop was directed by former professional cyclist Mike Creed, who in his own right had a very successful international cycling career. After coming on board with Team SmartStop and changing the program to a stage racing team, Creed led the team to many victories in 2014 including the USA Pro Road Race National Championships and the UCI America's Tour. It disbanded after the 2015 season. In January of 2016 riders came forward saying their wages for 2015 had not been fully paid yet.

2015 Roster
As at 1 January 2015

Major wins
Sources:

2008
 Harlem Skyscraper Classic, Erik Barlevav
 Stage 1 Tour of Ohio, David Duncan
 Marlton Criterium, Adam Myerson
 Louisville Criterium, Adam Myerson
 Taylorsville Criterium, Daniel Ramsey
 Lenoir Criterium, Daniel Ramsey
 Morganton Criterium, Daniel Ramsey
 Salem Criterium, Adam Myerson
 GP Mengoni, Adam Myerson
 San Francisco Criterium, Daniel Ramsey
 Winston-Salem Cyclo-cross, Jonathan Hamblen
2009
 Salisbury Crossroads Classic, Adam Myerson
 Roswell Criterium, Thomas Soladay
 Beaufort Criterium, Thomas Soladay
 Overall USA Crits Series Speed Week, Mark Hekman
 City Bikes Criterium, Erik Barlevav
 Stage 3 Tulsa, Daniel Ramsey
 Stage 5 Giro di Jersey, Isaac Howe
 Greensboro Carolina Cup, Isaac Howe
2010
 Atlanta US 100 K Classic, Joey Rosskopf
 New Gloucester Cyclo-cross, Adam Myerson
 Warwick Cyclo-cross, Adam Myerson
2012
 Delray Beach, Benjamin Charles Zawacki
 Athens Criterium, Luke Keough
 Roswell Criterium, Benjamin Charles Zawacki
 Somerville, Luke Keough
 Stage 3 Anderson Omnium, Jonathan Hamblen
 Boston Criterium, Luke Keough
 Southern Pines, Cyclo-cross, Travis Livermon
2013
 Dana Point, Shane Kline
 Stage 3 Johnson City Omnium, Christopher Uberti
 Breinigsville Scratch, Shane Kline
  National Novices Track Championships, Jackie Simes
  National Track Championships (Madison), Jackie Simes & Bobby Lea
 Madison Cup, Jackie Simes
 Madison Cup, Bobby Lea
2014
 Stage 1 Vuelta a la Independencia Nacional, Eric Marcotte
 Stages 3 & 6 Vuelta a la Independencia Nacional, Jure Kocjan
 Abbotsford, Zachary Bell
 Stage 3 Redlands Bicycle Classic, Travis McCabe
 Winston-Salem Cycling Classic, Travis McCabe
 Stage 3 Joe Martin Stage Race, Travis McCabe
  National Road Race Championships, Eric Marcotte
 Overall Grand Prix Cycliste de Saguenay, Jure Kocjan
Stage 4, Jure Kocjan
 Stage 5 Nature Valley Grand Prix, Travis McCabe
  Under-23 Time Trial National Championships, Kris Dahl
 Stage 2 Delta Road race, Shane Kline
 Stage 1 Cascade Cycling Classic, Eric Marcotte
 Stages 3 & 5 Cascade Cycling Classic, Travis McCabe
 Sprints classification Tour of Utah, Jure Kocjan
 Bucks County Classic Road Race, Zachary Bell
 Bucks County Classic Criterium, Shane Kline
 UCI America's Tour Individual, Jure Kocjan
 UCI America's Tour Team
2015
 Stage 3 Vuelta a la Independencia Nacional, Evan Huffman
 Stage 8 Vuelta a la Independencia Nacional, Robert Sweeting
 Teams classification Vuelta a la Independencia Nacional
  National Criterium Championships, Eric Marcotte
 Overall Tour of the Gila, Rob Britton
 Stage 2 Tour of Utah, Jure Kocjan

National champions
2013
  USA National Novices Track Championships, Jackie Simes
  USA National Track Championships (Madison), Jackie Simes
  USA National Track Championships (Madison), Robert Lea
2014
  USA National Road Race Championships, Eric Marcotte
  Canada U23 Time Trial National Championships, Kris Dahl
2015
  USA National Criterium Championships, Eric Marcotte
  Mexico Time Trial National Championships, Flavio De Luna

References

Defunct cycling teams based in the United States
UCI Continental Teams (America)
Cycling teams established in 2008
Cycling teams disestablished in 2015